The Burkina Faso women's national under-20 football team is the women's under-20 youth team for national football in Burkina Faso. The team is controlled by the Burkinabé Football Federation.

In 2015, the team reached the second round in the 2015 African U-20 Women's World Cup Qualifying Tournament.

The team finished in second place in the 2019 UNAF U-20 Women's Tournament, the 1st edition of the UNAF U-20 Women's Tournament.

The team qualified for the 2022 WAFU U20 Women's Cup to be held in Ghana.

References 

African national under-20 association football teams
women's under-20
African women's national under-20 association football teams